1800 Aguilar, provisional designation , is a stony Vestian asteroid from the inner regions of the asteroid belt, approximately 8 kilometers in diameter.

It was discovered on 12 September 1950, by Argentine astronomer Miguel Itzigsohn at La Plata Astronomical Observatory in Argentina. The asteroid was named after Argentine astronomer Félix Aguilar.

Orbit and classification 

The stony S-type asteroid is a member of the Vesta family. It orbits the Sun in the inner main-belt at a distance of 2.0–2.7 AU once every 3 years and 7 months (1,322 days). Its orbit has an eccentricity of 0.14 and an inclination of 6° with respect to the ecliptic. As no precoveries were taken, and no prior identifications were made, Aguilars observation arc begins with its official discovery observation.

Physical characteristics

Rotation period 

In September 2008, a rotational lightcurve of Aguilar was obtained from photometric observations taken by Australian amateur astronomer David Higgins. It gave a well-defined rotation period of 2.478 hours with a brightness variation of 0.11 in magnitude.

Diameter and albedo 

According to the survey carried out by NASA's Wide-field Infrared Survey Explorer with its subsequent NEOWISE mission, Aguilar measures 7.38 kilometers in diameter, and its surface has an albedo of 0.295, while the Collaborative Asteroid Lightcurve Link assumes a standard albedo for stony asteroids of 0.20 and calculates a diameter of 8.18 kilometers with an absolute magnitude of 12.8.

Naming 

This minor planet was named for Argentine astronomer Félix Aguilar (1884–1943), former director of the discovering observatory and founder of the University School of Astronomy and Geophysics. He contributed significantly to the development of Argentine astronomy in the first half of the 20th century (also see Félix Aguilar Observatory). The official  was published by the Minor Planet Center on 20 February 1976.

Notes

References

External links 
 asteroid light-curves, Higgins, D.J. (per 20 March 2015)
 Asteroid Lightcurve Database (LCDB), query form (info )
 Dictionary of Minor Planet Names, Google books
 Asteroids and comets rotation curves, CdR – Observatoire de Genève, Raoul Behrend
 Discovery Circumstances: Numbered Minor Planets (1)-(5000) – Minor Planet Center
 
 

001800
Discoveries by Miguel Itzigsohn
Named minor planets
19500912